Petinos is a Greek surname. Notable people with the surname include:

 Eleni Petinos (born 1985/86), Australian politician
 Helen Petinos (born 1993), Australian footballer

See also
 Mount Petinos, in Antarctica

Greek-language surnames